The Gibson J-45 is a dreadnought style  acoustic guitar  manufactured by the Gibson Guitar Corporation. It is generally regarded as Gibson's most famous and widely used acoustic guitar model.

The J-45 is part of Gibson's round-shoulder "jumbo" line, begun in 1934 with the Jumbo Flattop introduced to compete with C.F. Martin & Company's "D" line.  It is noted for its sunburst finish, warm bass and good projection, and outstanding playability. The structurally similar naturally finished J-50 first appeared in 1942, but did not enter continuous production until 1947.

History
Introduced in 1942 to replace the inexpensive Great Depression-era flattop J-35, the J-45 standardized the company's approach to the dreadnought guitar. With a list price of $45, it nonetheless initially only varied slightly, with strengthened internal bracing and a new teardrop-shaped pickguard. A headstock decal with the Gibson logo replaced both the old stark white silkscreened 'Gibson' of the thirties and the slogan "Only a Gibson Is Good Enough." It also had a more rounded, "baseball bat" style neck, as opposed to the "V" shape of the J-35 neck. The version produced today is substantially similar to the 1942 model.

Cosmetically, the J-45 was understated, intended as a durable no-frills "workhorse guitar" (its nickname given by the manufacturer). Although a few triple-bound top types were initially produced, the standard  single binding was simple, soundhole ring austere, and neck only sported modest dot-shaped mother of pearl fretboard position markers. Gibson used a sunburst finish to cover up imperfections in the wood joins. The top was solid spruce, the back and sides solid mahogany. Over time the sunburst has become iconic, with collectors preferring the J-45 to the higher-end J-50s of the same era. Apart from a small batch of natural-finish J-45s produced in 1942, the model was offered only in sunburst.

1969 Gibson J-45
Starting in 1968 Gibson made J-45's as square-shouldered dreadnaught-shaped guitars with a longer scale (25.5"), similar to the Gibson Dove. Serial numbers tell us that during '68 and '69 both slope-shouldered and square-shouldered J-45's were made before the model changeover was complete. In the '70's the J-45 was re-labeled as the J-45 Deluxe. A short run of slope-shouldered J-45 Celebrity models were made in 1984. By the late '90's the slope-shouldered body style returned for good.

Gibson J-50
The J-50 guitars is essentially a natural-finish J-45, with a triple rather than single-bound top and other minor differences in trim. Gibson produced a handful in 1942 using high quality wood laid up before World War II-induced shortages took hold. By 1947 supplies had resumed, resulting in the model's official introduction. There are mid-1960s J45 guitars with a natural finish and adjustable bridges and this can be checked by the stamp on the back seam brace.

Notable players of the J-45

John Hammond
Eric Idle (used for composing "Always look on the bright side of life")
Gary Kemp

Notable players of the J-50

Jorma Kaukonen

James Taylor

Notes

References

External links

 
 J-45 at Vintage Guitars website
 Gibson J-45 on Fretbase - includes specs, photos and videos

1942 in music
Products introduced in 1942
J45